Eugenia fernandopoana Engl. & Brehmer, Bot. Jahrb. Syst. 54:337,1917, is a species of plant in the family Myrtaceae. It is found in Cameroon, Central African Republic, and Equatorial Guinea. Its natural habitat is subtropical or tropical moist lowland forests. It is threatened by habitat loss.

References

fernandopoana
Vulnerable plants
Flora of Cameroon
Flora of the Central African Republic
Flora of Equatorial Guinea
Taxonomy articles created by Polbot